Christ Church, Yardley Wood is a Grade II listed parish church in the Church of England in Birmingham.

History

The foundation stone was laid on 14 April 1848. The church was built by Sarah Taylor of Moor Green to designs by the architect, Arthur Edward Perkins. It was consecrated on 28 March 1849 by the Bishop of Worcester.

A parish was assigned in 1849 out of St Edburgha's Church, Yardley and St Nicolas' Church, Kings Norton.

The west tower was completed in 1896.

Parts of the parish were taken to form the parish of St Agnes' Church, Moseley in 1914, Holy Cross Church, Billesley Common in 1937, and Immanuel Church, Highter's Heath in 1938.

The church contains wood paneling and carving given by the Earl of Denbigh to St Bartholomew's Church, Birmingham, and moved to Christ Church after that church was destroyed in the Second World War.

Organ

A barrel organ by J.W. Walker was installed here from St Mary's Church, Moseley. This was replaced or extended by Halmshaw and Conacher. A specification of the organ can be found on the National Pipe Organ Register. The organ is no longer present.

References

Church of England church buildings in Birmingham, West Midlands
Churches completed in 1849
19th-century Church of England church buildings
Grade II listed buildings in Birmingham
1849 establishments in England
Grade II listed churches in the West Midlands (county)
Yardley Wood